Leiostyla relevata is a species of small air-breathing land snail in the family Lauriidae. It is endemic to Ilhéu de Baixo, an islet near Porto Santo Island in the Madeira archipelago.

This snail is only known from a single site on the wet seaside cliffs of the islet. The population, though small, is likely stable because the island is isolated from most threats.

References

Leiostyla
Endemic fauna of Madeira
Molluscs of Madeira
Porto Santo Island
Gastropods described in 1878
Taxonomy articles created by Polbot